Keven Lacombe (born  July 12, 1985 in Amos, Quebec) is a Canadian professional racing cyclist. He was also an ice hockey player for Drummondville Voltigeurs of the Quebec Major Junior Hockey League.

Career highlights

 2003: Canadian junior time-trial champion
 2007: 1st in Stage 3 Coupe de la Paix
 2007: 1st in Stage 5 Vuelta a Chihuahua
 2008: 1st in Stage 2 Tour of Pennsylvania
 2009: 1st in Stage 1 Vuelta a Cuba
 2009: 1st in Stage 9a Vuelta a Cuba
 2009: 1st in Stage 9b Vuelta a Cuba
 2009: 1st in Stage 10 Vuelta a Cuba
 2010: 1st in Stage 4 Vuelta a Cuba
 2010: 1st in Stage 9 Vuelta a Cuba
 2010: 1st in Grand Prix des Marbriers

External links

1985 births
Living people
Canadian male cyclists
Canadian ice hockey players
Drummondville Voltigeurs players
Sportspeople from Quebec
People from Amos, Quebec